HMS Lichfield was a 50-gun fourth-rate ship of the line of the Royal Navy, built at Portsmouth Dockyard and launched on 4 February 1695.

She underwent a rebuild according to the 1719 Establishment at Plymouth, and was relaunched on 25 March 1730. Lichfield continued in service until 1744, when she was broken up.

Notes

Citations

References

 Lavery, Brian (2003) The Ship of the Line - Volume 1: The development of the battlefleet 1650-1850. Conway Maritime Press. .
 Rif Winfield, The 50-gun Ship, Chatham Publishing, 1997. 
 

 

Ships of the line of the Royal Navy
1690s ships